Schlapp is the surname of:

 Alyce Louise Schlapp (1912–1999), American politician
 George E. Schlapp (1839–1912), American brewer
 Lothar Schlapp (1960), former professional German footballer
 Matt Schlapp (1967), American political activist and lobbyist
 Mercedes Schlapp (1972), American communications specialist and political commentator
 Robert Schlapp (1899–1991), British physicist and mathematician of German descent

German-language surnames
Surnames from nicknames